The Tallinn Marathon is an annual road marathon, held in Tallinn, Estonia. It is held in September and is the biggest annual marathon in Estonia.  Both the marathon and the half marathon held the day before are categorized as Bronze Label Road Races by World Athletics.

History 

The first regularly-held marathon was held in 2010.  Prior to this, the marathon was first held in 1989 with about 100 runners, and a half marathon and a 10 km race had been held regularly since 2000.

In 2015, Estonian Marti Medar set a world record for completing a marathon while dribbling a basketball, finishing in 3:04:15.  In 2017, Medar set a world record for completing a marathon while dribbling two basketballs at the same time, doing so in 3:54:16, and then set it again in 2021 with a time of 3:36:36.

The 2020 in-person edition of the race was cancelled due to the coronavirus pandemic, with all registrants given the option of running the race virtually, transferring their entry to 2021, or obtaining a refund.

Winners 

Key: Course record (in bold)

Marathon

Half marathon

10 kilometers

See also
List of marathon races in Europe

Notes

References

External links
Tallinn Marathon

Marathons in Europe
Recurring sporting events established in 2000
Sports competitions in Tallinn
2000 establishments in Estonia
Autumn events in Estonia